Garis is a surname. Notable people with the surname include:

Howard R. Garis (1873–1962), American author
Lilian Garis (1873–1954), American author, wife of Howard
Roger Garis (1901–1967), American author

See also
Faris (name)
Garis (Galilee)
Paris (surname)